Clemente Albèri (1803 in Rimini – 1864 in Bologna) was an Italian painter, best known for portraits and copies of Renaissance and Baroque works.

He first trained under his father, Francesco, who was professor of painting at the Academy of Fine Arts of Bologna, active in a  neoclassical style. Clemente was professor of painting first in Pesaro, then in Bologna. He painted the cupola of the chapel of San Domenico.

He made celebrated copies, including of the Communion of St Jerome by Agostino Carracci, commissioned in 1825 for the church of San Girolamo della Certosa by Prince Clemente Spada Varalli; a Pietà by Guido Reni, completed around 1841, for the church of Santa Maria della Pietà; and the Santa Cecilia by Raphael (1861) for the church of San Giovanni in Monte. He also painted portraits, among them of Pope Pius VII (late 1820s); Pope Pius VIII; Countess Giulia Tomasi Amiani; and Countess Ersilia Turrini-Rossi Marsigli.

References

1803 births
1864 deaths
People from Rimini
19th-century Italian painters
Italian male painters
Painters from Bologna
19th-century Italian male artists